Charmer is the eighth studio album by singer-songwriter Aimee Mann, released by SuperEgo Records in the UK on September 17, 2012, and in the US on September 18.

The album was produced by Mann's bassist, Paul Bryan, and features a guest appearance by The Shins frontman James Mercer, who duets with Mann on the track "Living a Lie."  It debuted on the Billboard 200 at No. 33.

Laura Linney and John Hodgman star in the music video for the first single, "Charmer."

The video for the second single, "Labrador," is a shot-for-shot remake of the video for "Voices Carry," the 1985 hit of Mann's former band, 'Til Tuesday, with the exception of Town Hall replacing Carnegie Hall.

Reception 

Charmer so far has a score of 73 out of 100 from Metacritic based on "generally favorable reviews". Jody Rosen, in Rolling Stone magazine, criticized its lyrics and production concluding "[T]here's little new here, and even less charm". Allmusic, however, was more positive, citing its hooks as "spiky and precise", and concluding that it was "an immediate, engaging pop record".

Other reviews are positive: Filter gave the album a score of 84% and stated that "Thirty years in, Mann continues to charm, a hidden glint in her eye." Mojo gave the album four stars out of five and called it "an Americana and power-pop confection with piano and tasteful guitars swaddled in the choicest vintage tones." The Independent gave it a favorable review and called it "Another sweet viper's bite of post-Freudian dyspepsia from the singersongwriter who loves to mistrust." Paste gave it a score of 7.8 out of ten and stated: "The simple fact that Aimee Mann continues writing songs around these distressing observations and putting them out on such achingly beautiful records seems proof that-despite all the twisted, cutting truths she's spied under the lens of her artistic microscope—she still somehow clings to the sable cloud's silver flash." The A.V. Club gave it a B and said that Mann "is able to match her ideas to music with real kick."

Other reviews are average or mixed: Q gave the album three stars out of five and called Mann "good and snarky". The New York Times gave it an average review and said it "represents a sunny term for [Mann], at least in relative terms." The Boston Globe, however, gave it a mixed review and stated: "Too many tracks flirt with flat inconsequentiality, and too often the lyrics slip by without the sting of Mann's normally incisive wordsmithery."

Track listing
All songs written by Aimee Mann, except where noted.

"Charmer" – 3:25
"Disappeared" – 3:24
"Labrador" – 3:49
"Crazytown" – 3:21
"Soon Enough" (Mann, Tim Heidecker) – 3:59
"Living a Lie" (featuring James Mercer) (Mann, Paul Bryan) – 3:26
"Slip and Roll" – 4:12
"Gumby" – 2:53
"Gamma Ray" – 3:00
"Barfly" – 4:00
"Red Flag Diver" – 2:29
"Brother's Keeper" (Bonus Track) – 4:06
"Mea Culpa" (Bonus Track) – 2:29
"Swanee River" (Bonus Track)  - 4:08

Personnel
Aimee Mann – lead vocals, acoustic guitar
James Mercer – vocals on "Living a Lie"
J. J. Johnson – drums
Jay Bellerose – percussion
Chris Bruce – electric guitar
Paul Bryan – bass, Mellotron, background vocals
Jebin Bruni – piano, keyboards
Jamie Edwards – electric guitar, piano, keyboards, tubular bells

Notes

References

External links
 

Aimee Mann albums
2012 albums
Albums produced by Paul Bryan (musician)
SuperEgo Records albums